Nedre Stjørdal or Nedre Stjørdalen is a former municipality in the old Nord-Trøndelag county in Norway. The municipality existed from 1850 until its dissolution in 1902. The  municipality covered the western part of what is now the municipality of Stjørdal in Trøndelag county. The administrative centre was located at Værnes where Værnes Church is located.

History
The municipality was established in 1850 when the old municipality of Stjørdalen was divided into Øvre Stjørdal (population: 5,100) and Nedre Stjørdal (population: 6,543). On 1 January 1902, Nedre Stjørdal was dissolved and it was divided into three new municipalities: Lånke (population: 1,449), Skatval (population: 2,125), and Stjørdal (population: 3,158).

Name
The municipality (originally the parish) is named after the Stjørdalen valley. The first element is the word  which means "lower", referring to the fact that it is the lower part of the valley. The second element is the genitive case of the local river name  (now called the Stjørdalselva river). The meaning of the river name is unknown.

Government
During its existence, this municipality was governed by a municipal council of elected representatives, which in turn elected a mayor.

Mayors
The mayors of Stjørdalen:

 1850–1853: Mathias Lund 
 1854–1857: Johan Ertzgaard
 1858–1860: J.P. Holan
 1860–1863: Johan Ertzgaard
 1864–1867: Lars Soelberg
 1868–1871: Bortinus Ydsti
 1872–1875: Lars Soelberg (V)
 1876–1883: John O. Arnstad (V)
 1884–1889: Bernhard Øverland (V)
 1890–1891: John O. Arnstad (V)
 1892–1901: Bernhard Øverland (V)

See also
List of former municipalities of Norway

References

Stjørdal
Former municipalities of Norway
1850 establishments in Norway
1902 disestablishments in Norway